is an anime series that focuses on seventeen-year-old Kyosuke Date who was killed by his mother Mio Date, and afterward gained the ability to turn into an incredibly powerful winged mutant known as "The SoulTaker" and that he has a long-lost twin sister named Runa, and that his past is all a lie.

The series was directed by Akiyuki Shinbo and was Tatsunoko's first anime to utilize digital animation as well as the first anime to be broadcast on high-definition television, and features a five-episode spinoff OVA miniseries featuring the character Komugi titled Nurse Witch Komugi, albeit Shinbo did not return to direct the OVAs.

Plot
After being stabbed in the chest by his mother, Kyosuke Date is resurrected to find out he has a twin sister named Runa, and the ability to transform into the amazingly strong, powerful and dangerous superhuman mutant known as the SoulTaker. As he seeks out his twin sister, he is being pursued by the strange mutant doctors and nurses of the hospital, led by his own father, Richard Vincent, as well as the evil Kirihara corporation, led by Yui Kirihara, who are also tracking down Runa for their own malevolent purposes.

Assisting him along the way are the mysterious Shiro Mibu and the nurse mutant girl Komugi Nakahara, who betrayed the Hospital out of strong romantic love for Kyosuke.

Characters
 
The main character. He is a mutant boy who is kind-hearted, generous, selfless, serious and determined. After being stabbed in the heart by his adoptive mother, Mio, he returns to life to find his long-lost twin sister, Runa. He has the mutant ability to transform into the tremendously strong and dangerous superhuman mutant known as "The SoulTaker". He can also communicate and resonate telepathically with Runa and the fragments of her spirit/soul called flickers. 

In Nurse Witch Komugi, he appears as a seventeen-year-old star who helps his long-lost twin sister Runa who has mysteriously been released from his body and retains her five-year-old look.

 
Kyosuke's adoptive mother who had stabbed him in the heart in order to awaken his dormant abilities as a mutant, as the only way to have done so was to betray a loved one. She was a good friend of Tsubaki Tokisaka, who entrusted Mio to raise Tsubaki's son, as Tsubaki did want to involve him with her family's dark ambitions regarding her twin daughter and his own twin sister, Runa.

 
 The first mutant that Kyosuke faces in the premiere episode "The Crest of the Devil." Kyoya fights Kyosuke (now in his mutant form) but is eventually defeated when Kyosuke kills him with the Lightning Breaker.

 
 The CEO and head of the Kirihara Corporation, and one of the series' antagonists. She is killed by the Alien, who is later revealed to be five-year-old Runa herself. In Nurse Witch Komugi, she appears as a director of the company; her return unknown. 

 
 The man who aligns himself with Kyosuke and Komugi against the Kirihara Corporation. It is later revealed that Shiro is Yui's younger brother.

 
 Kyosuke's good friend and savior, who was soon kidnapped by the Kirihara Corporation to be experimented on to search for Runa Tokisaka. She was the very first Flicker to be created. She is restored to life when all of the Flickers leave Runa. She was the first SoulAnubis, before all the Flickers were absorbed into Runa.

 
 A nurse girl who betrayed the Hospital to help Kyosuke after she realizes that she has fallen for him. She is the main protagonist in the mini spin-off, Nurse Witch Komugi.

 
 One of the main antagonists who is the late Tsubaki's husband, and the father of Kyosuke and Runa. He is also a mutant, with the ability to turn into the mutant SoulCrusher. He battles his son in the fifth episode, and reveals the truth about the Hospital and the Beta Applicon virus to Kyosuke. He ends up being destroyed by his own son in their second (and last) battle.

 
 She is the wife of Richard Vincent and mother of fraternal twins Kyosuke and Runa. She was one of the Tokisaka Clan who used the extraterrestrial substance of the Beta Applicon to further their research in eradicating disease and the evolution of humankind. She was the first to be saved after her father, Daigo Tokisaka, had injected the alien anti-virus into her system. Five years later, she and her daughter were pursued by the members of the Kirihara Corporation. Knowing that she could no longer protect Runa, she had stabbed her in the chest in order for Runa to develop her inherent mutant abilities. The circumstances of her demise is unknown, though Runa had unconsciously created a Flicker that took on her appearance and memories. This motherly flicker appeared to Kyosuke in the seventh episode, "The Last of a Woman".

 
The main antagonist who is Kyosuke's fraternal twin sister and creator of the Flickers. She is accused of being the Devil. Although she appears to be five years old, she is actually seventeen years old. She appears as a five-year-old child when her Flickers are not in her body. When they were absorbed into her body, she transformed into a seventeen-year-old teenage girl, which is her true form and can turn into the mutant SoulAnubis. In the spinoff Nurse Witch Komugi, she is a five-year-old child star who works alongside her seventeen-year-old twin brother Kyosuke.

Terminology
 - A very deadly antidote that was created by Daigo Tokisaka for the sole purpose of destroying the Beta Applicon.  It is powerful enough to be hurled like missiles to wipe out all mankind on Earth.
 - A virus capable of turning humans into mutants by altering their DNA.
 - These are fragments of Runa that she generates as well as being reflections of her existence.
 - An organization founded by its director Richard Vincent and many surviving mutants to relieve those who were infected with the Beta Applicon. 
 - Originally a funeral business company, the Kirihara Corporation is a large global conglomerate. Armed with cutting-edge science and power, facilities and factories are set up around the world.

Anime
This thirteen episode-series produced by Tatsunoko Productions and directed by Akiyuki Shinbo, premiered on the Japanese television network WOWOW on April 4, 2001 and ended exactly 3 months later  on July 4, 2001. Two days after the last episode aired, North American anime licensor Geneon Entertainment USA licensed the series and released it on 4 volumes on DVD and VHS. In 2004, Geneon had re-released the series under their Signature Series label.

It originally aired in the United States on TechTV as part of Anime Unleashed, and later aired on G4 after the TechTV merger.

The series' opening theme is "Soul Taker" by JAM Project while the ending theme is "Memory" by Shinji Kakijima.

References

External links

2001 anime television series debuts
Action anime and manga
Anime with original screenplays
Geneon USA
MF Bunko J
NBCUniversal Entertainment Japan
Tatsunoko Production
Wowow original programming
Television series about mutants
Filicide in fiction
Fiction about resurrection
Animated television series about twins